Walid Al-Omari (وليد العمري) (born; 11 February 1957) is an Arab / Palestinian journalist, writer and the bureau chief of Al Jazeera in Jerusalem and Ramallah.

Early life and education
Al-Omari was born in Sandala, Israel on 11 February 1957. He studied at Arab Orthodox College Haifa. He received a degree in International relations from the Hebrew University of Jerusalem. Also studied at Tel Aviv University and then received a doctorate in media from The Hague University of Applied Sciences.

Career 
He first joined the MBC and NBC channel as a correspondent between 1991 and 1995 then joined the Al Jazeera channel on June 26, 1996. One year later he won the title of the chief correspondent. He also worked for several press institutions, including the Palestinian Press Services, Al-Awda magazine in occupied Jerusalem, Radio Orient in Paris, Multicult.fm in Berlin and the Lebanese newspaper Al-Moustaqbal from 1997 to 2000.

Literary works

Awards and honors
 Holy Land Fund Award (2004) 
 Palestine International Media Award (2002)
 Arab Media Club Award (2001) Dubai
 He also participated in many local and international conferences, workshops and seminars.

References

Living people
1957 births
Al Jazeera people
Palestinian reporters and correspondents
Palestinian writers
Hebrew University of Jerusalem Faculty of Social Sciences alumni
Tel Aviv University alumni
The Hague University of Applied Sciences alumni
NBC employees
Israeli Arab journalists
Israeli Arab writers
Israeli people of Palestinian descent
Arab citizens of Israel